Talisia bullata is a species of plant in the family Sapindaceae. It is endemic to Ecuador.

References

bullata
Endemic flora of Ecuador
Critically endangered plants
Taxonomy articles created by Polbot